Glossoptosis is a medical condition and abnormality which involves the downward displacement or retraction of the tongue. It may cause non-fusion of the hard palate, causing cleft palate.

It is one of the features of Pierre Robin sequence and Down syndrome.

References

Congenital disorders of musculoskeletal system
Tongue disorders